Claudio Rinaldi (born November 29, 1987 in Bormio) is an Italian short track speed skater.

Rinaldi competed at the 2010 Winter Olympics for Italy. He was a member of the 5000 metre relay team, which was disqualified in its semifinal.

As of 2013, Rinaldi's best performance at the World Championships is 5th, as a member of the Italian 5000 metre relay team in 2009 and 2010. His best individual finish is 20th, in the 1000 metres in 2008. He has also won three gold medals as a member of the Italian relay team at the European Short Track Speed Skating Championships.

As of 2013, Rinaldi has one ISU Short Track Speed Skating World Cup podium finish, a bronze medal as part of the 5000 metre relay team in 2007–08 at Torino. His top World Cup ranking is 18th, in the 1000 metres in 2008–09.

World Cup Podiums

References 

1987 births
Living people
Italian male short track speed skaters
Olympic short track speed skaters of Italy
Short track speed skaters at the 2010 Winter Olympics
Sportspeople from the Province of Sondrio